Alan Dzutsev may refer to:
 Alan Dzutsev (footballer born 1988), Ukrainian footballer
 Alan Dzutsev (footballer born 1991), Russian footballer